The Weber County Main Library, at 2464 Jefferson Ave. in Ogden, Utah, was listed on the National Register of Historic Places in 2019.

It is a New Formalist style building designed by architect John L. Piers  (1922–1997) and built in 1968.

Others involved in its creation are Kenneth E. Hasenoehrl and Donald W. Mathewson as associate architects, and Edmund W. Allen.

Piers also received assistance from Charlotte, North Carolina-based Galvin-Van Buren Associates.

References

Libraries in Utah
National Register of Historic Places in Weber County, Utah
New Formalist architecture
Buildings and structures completed in 1968